The Bridge River Cones, sometimes referred to as the Lillooet Cones and Salal Creek Cones, is the name given to a volcanic field located on the north flank of the upper Bridge River, about  west of the town of Gold Bridge.  The cones are in the lee of the Lillooet Icecap and sit astride a group of passes between the Bridge River, which flows W-E to their south, and the Lord River, which flows north to the Taseko Lakes in the Chilcotin District.

Geology

The Bridge River Cones consist of small trachybasaltic and basaltic eruptive centers.

Tuber Hill, a small basaltic stratovolcano with a potassium-argon date of 0.6 million years, was constructed on the Bridge River upland when neighboring valleys were filled by ice.

The youngest volcanic rocks in the Bridge River volcanic field lie east of Tuber Hill and are remnants of valley-filling basalt flows. The age of these valley-filling basalt flows is unknown but the presence of unconsolidated glacial until under the flows suggest they are less than 1,500 years old.

See also

Bridge River Power Project
Bridge River, British Columbia
Bridge River Indian Band
Bridge River Canyon
Bridge River Country
Garibaldi Volcanic Belt
Cascade Volcanoes
Cascade Range
Spruce Lake Protected Area
Tsʼilʔos Provincial Park
Lillooet Icecap
List of volcanoes in Canada
Volcanism of Canada
Volcanism of Western Canada

References

External links
 
 
 
 
 "NASA/JPL satellite images" location only
 

Volcanoes of British Columbia
Volcanic fields of Canada
Garibaldi Volcanic Belt
Bridge River Country
Pacific Ranges
Pleistocene volcanoes
Holocene volcanoes
Inactive volcanoes